This is a list of films produced, co-produced, and/or distributed by Warner Bros. and also its subsidiary First National Pictures for the years 1918–1919. From 1928 to 1936, films by First National continued to be credited solely to "First National Pictures". In July 1936, stockholders of First National Pictures, Inc. (primarily Warner Bros.) voted to dissolve the corporation and no further separate First National Pictures were made. This list does not include direct-to-video releases or films from New Line Cinema prior to its merger with Warner Bros. in 2008, nor does it include third-party films or films Warner gained the rights to as a result of mergers or acquisitions.

1910s

1920s

See also 
 List of New Line Cinema films
 List of films based on DC Comics
 List of Warner Bros. theatrical animated feature films
 :Category:Lists of films by studio

References 

Lists of Warner Bros. films
Warner Bros. films
Warner Bros